Nickel niobate is a complex oxide which as a solid material has found potential applications in catalysis and lithium batteries.

Properties

Complexes 
Nickel niobate has been added to other elements forming bismuth nickel niobate, providing a dense ceramic body at low sintering temperatures. Cubic pyrochlore, tetragonal pyrochlore, and other unknown phases were found.

Dielectric studies showed that ceramic  is a typical relaxor ferroelectric with properties like those of its single-crystals.

Applications 
Nickel niobate has been examined for use as a catalyst to reduce 4-nitrophenol due to a photo-synergistic effect that exploits the synergy between thermal active sites and photogenerated electrons.

Nickel niobate has also been examined in an "open and regular" crystalline form for use as the anode in a lithium ion battery. It forms a porous, nano-scale structure that eliminates the dendrite formation that can cause short circuits and other problems. The material offers energy density of 244 mAh g−1 and retains 80%+ of its capacity across 20k cycles. The manufacturing process is straightforward and does not require a clean room. The anode offers a diffusion coefficient of 10−12 cm2 s−1 at 300 K, which allows fast charging/dischargine at high current densities, yielding capacities of 140 and 50 mAh g−1 for 10 and 100C respectively.

References

External links 
 
 
 

Nickel compounds
Nickel complexes
Battery (electricity)
Catalysts
Niobates